Washington High School, commonly referred to as Massillon High School or Massillon Washington High School, is a 9th to 12th grade secondary school within the Massillon City School District in the city of Massillon, Ohio, United States. 

The school colors are orange and black, and the school's athletic teams are known as the Massillon Tigers.

Academics 
Washington High School provides programs including college readiness and vocational technical careers. Developing Resources for Education and Athletics in Massillon (D.R.E.A.M) is a collaborative effort through the Paul & Carol David Foundation, Massillon schools, Walsh University and the Aultman Health Foundation and provides students interested in a career in sports medicine to earn college credits in high school. Rated an "Excellent" school district by the Ohio Department of Education.

History 

The original Washington High School was constructed in 1913 and used to sit on the corner of Oak and 1st street southeast in downtown Massillon. The current Washington High School was constructed in 1992 adjacent to Paul Brown Tiger Stadium.

Football
Football came to the Massillon in 1894 with the first high school game between Massillon High School and Canton Central High School. In the early years, the players consisted of working boys because most boys did not attend high school. By 1904 more boys began attending school past 8th grade. 1909 was Massillon's first undefeated football team. From 1910-1920 high school football in Massillon grew and improved, and by 1916 they were named the Scholastic Champions of Ohio. The school mascot, the Tiger, was adopted from the city's former professional football team known as the Massillon Tigers.

Paul Brown, a 1925 graduate of Washington High School, returned to Massillon in 1932 to begin his renowned coaching career. In his nine years at Massillon, Brown posted an 80–8–2 record which included a 35-game winning streak and six state championships.

The Massillon Tigers are historically one of the winningest high school football teams in the United States, currently ranked 3rd in the nation in all-time wins. The Tigers have compiled a current record of 880 wins, 290 losses, and 36 ties. Along with the Canton McKinley High School Bulldogs, the Tigers represent one half of what many consider to be the greatest high school football rivalry in the nation. It is the only high school contest in America to feature odds in Las Vegas. In 128 meetings (1894–2017), Massillon leads the series 70-53-5. Massillon and their fierce rivalry with Canton are subjects of the 2001 documentary film Go Tigers!. A total of 23 professional players, 3 NFL coaches and 14 collegiate all-Americans have graduated from Massillon High School.

The Tigers play their home games at Paul Brown Tiger Stadium. The stadium currently holds 16,600 people and is named after former Tiger player and head coach Paul Brown. Besides being the regular season home of the Massillon Tiger Football team, the stadium hosts Ohio High School Athletic Association state football playoff games, divisional championship games, as well as numerous other activities such as band shows and other sports including soccer.

Every fall, the booster club provides a live tiger cub named "Obie" who is on the sidelines for each home football game. So strong is the tradition and history, the booster club provides each baby boy born in Massillon a miniature football.

In summer 2008, due to the success of the Tigers' athletic programs, ESPN nominated the city of Massillon as a candidate for Titletown USA. The final results ended with Massillon finishing in the top 4.

Titles
Prior to the implementation of the playoff system in 1972, Washington High School won the Ohio AP State Championship title 24 times; however, they have never won a State Title in any sport in the playoff era. The Tigers were state runners-up in 2005 (lost to St. Xavier 24-17), 2018 (lost 42-28 to Archbishop Hoban), 2019 (lost 34-17 to La Salle), and 2020 (Lost to Archbishop Hoban again 35-6).

They have been recognized as the AP National Champions nine times – in 1935, 1936, 1939, 1940, 1950, 1952, 1953, 1959, 1961 – the most in the nation.

Past coaches

 Hap Fugate, 1909–1911 (19–8–3)
 Sidney Jones, 1912–1913 (9–9–1)
 John Snavely, 1914–1919 (41–8–2)
 Elmer Snyder, 1920 (3–4–1)
 Dave Stewart, 1921–1925 (38–9)
 Dan Atkinson, 1926–1927 (8–7–3)
 Elmer McGrew, 1928–1931 (20–16–4)
 Paul Brown, 1932–1940 (80–8–2)
 Bud Houghton, 1941, 1946–1947 (21–6–3)
 Elwood Kammer, 1942–1944 (26–4)
 Augie Morningstar, 1945 (5–0–5)
 Chuck Mather, 1948–1953 (57–3)
 Tom Harp, 1954–1955 (17–2–1)
 Lee Tressel, 1956–1957 (16–3)
 Leo Strang, 1958–1963 (54–8–1)
 Earle Bruce, 1964–1965 (20–0)
 Bob Seaman, 1966–1968 (20–9–1)
 Bob Commings, 1969–1973 (43–6–2)
 Chuck Shuff, 1974–1975 (12–7–1)
 Mike Currence, 1976–1984 (79–16–2)
 John Maronto, 1985–1987 (20–10)
 Lee Owens, 1988–1991 (35–13)
 Jack Rose, 1992–1997 (48–17)
 Rick Shepas, 1998–2004 (53–27)
 Tom Stacey, 2005–2007 (26–11)
 Jason Hall, 2008–2014 (57–21)
 Nate Moore, 2015–present

Notable individuals

 Andy Alleman, offensive lineman; played college football at the University of Akron; Played for the NFL's Kansas City Chiefs
 Robert Arter (class of 1946), U.S. Army lieutenant general
 Paul Brown, Washington H.S. Head Coach 1932-40; Head Coach, Ohio State; Head Coach 1946-1962, Cleveland Browns; elected to Pro Football Hall of Fame in 1967; Head Coach/General Manager 1968-75, Cincinnati Bengals
 Earle Bruce, undefeated Washington H.S. Head Coach 1964-65; Head Coach University of Tampa, Iowa State University, Ohio State University, University of Northern Iowa, and Colorado State University 1972-1992
 David Canary, actor who starred in both soap operas and prime time television
 Shawn Crable, linebacker for the University of Michigan, drafted by the New England Patriots. 2-time All-Big Ten, 2nd Team Walter Camp All-American in 2007. Drafted in the 3rd round.
 Bill Edwards, College Football Hall of Fame head coach inductee, and former head coach of the Detroit Lions of the National Football League (NFL)
 Dennis Franklin, former wide receiver for the Detroit Lions of the National Football League. Franklin was the first African American starting quarterback for the University of Michigan.
 Horace Gillom, former punter and offensive end in the All-America Football Conference (AAFC) and the National Football League (NFL) for the Cleveland Browns
 Lin Houston, former guard who played in the All-America Football Conference (AAFC) and the National Football League (NFL) for the Cleveland Browns
 Don James, quarterback and defensive back for two state championship teams; Head Coach University of Washington 1975-92, Kent State 1971-74; National College Coach of the Year in 1984 and 1991; elected to College Football Hall of Fame in 1997
 Tommy James, former defensive halfback for the Cleveland Browns
 Mark Kozelek (class of 1984), lead singer of Red House Painters and Sun Kil Moon; actor (Almost Famous)
 Lori Lightfoot (class of 1980), attorney, 56th [Mayor of Chicago] of Chicago, and former president of Chicago Police Board
 Ed Molinski, 1939 Consensus All-American guard at the University of Tennessee; Member of Tennessee's 1938 National Championship team; Member of the College Football Hall of Fame
 Jack Oliver, geophysicist who studied earthquakes and ultimately provided seismic evidence supporting plate tectonics
 Chris Spielman, linebacker, Class of 1984 (All American); (College) LB, Ohio State 1984-87 (two-time All American, three-time All Big Ten); (Pro) LB, 1988-95 Detroit Lions, Buffalo Bills 1996-97, 1999 Cleveland Browns (four-time Pro Bowl honors)
 Stalley, born Kyle Myricks (musician/rapper), signed to Rick Ross' Maybach Music Group.
 Harry Stuhldreher, quarterback, later one of the Four Horsemen of Notre Dame
 Jeff Timmons (Class of 1991), singer-songwriter/musician, founder/member of 98 Degrees, former artist on Motown Records & Universal Records
 Stanfield Wells, tight end at the University of Michigan; Massillon's first All-American, Walter Camp All-American (1910)
 George Whitfield Jr., former Arena Football League player
 Alex Wood (Class of 1974), college football and NFL coach
 Justin Zwick, set several Ohio High School passing records en route to a scholarship to play at Ohio State University
 Erik White, Quarterback - BGSU; two-time MAC MVP (1991,1992); 24-7-2 as a starter
 Devin Smith, former Wide Receiver for the Ohio State Buckeyes and current NFL free agent. Member of the Buckeye's 2014 College Football Playoff Championship team.
 Gareon Conley, NFL cornerback for the Houston Texans; Member of Ohio State's 2014 College Football Playoff Championship team.

Massillon Tiger Swing Band 
The Massillon Tiger Swing Band was created by the legendary George "Red" Bird in 1938 during the Paul Brown era of Massillon football. The band became known as "The Greatest Show in High School Football" and is still a very important part of the Massillon football tradition. The band's swing style includes moving formations and musicians marching with a swing step. The Tiger Swing band begins every home football game with the traditional hometown songs of "Massillon Will Shine", "Stand Up and Cheer" (to acknowledge the other team), “Eye of the Tiger”, “Seven Nation Army”, The W.H.S. Alma Mater, and The Star Spangled Banner/ The National Anthem. At the beginning of each half time show, they perform what is known as "Opening Routine". This is a tradition that goes back for decades and consists of the band's entrance ("Turn Arounds") followed by "Fanfare", "Tiger Rag" and "Carry On". This entire routine is marched at 180 beats per minute and is practiced from the beginning of the rehearsals through the entire season. Each home game the Swing Band performs a new halftime show for the crowd, always with a theme. The 2020 edition of the band includes two Drum Majors, four Majorettes, and the mascot, Obie.

The Swing Band is currently directed by Jason Neel, who has been the head director since 2005. The 2020 edition of the Massillon Tiger Swing Band had an enrollment of 135.

References

External links
 School website
 Massillon City School District
 Massillon Tigers Football History
 Tiger Swing Band

High schools in Stark County, Ohio
Public high schools in Ohio
Buildings and structures in Massillon, Ohio